The Spanish Rally Championship is a rallying series run over the course of a year, that comprises  tarmac and gravel surface events. 2021 is the 3rd season of the series. The season was due to begin in Rally Tierras Altas de Lorca, but got postponed. Instead, it started in Rallye Sierra Morena

Changes 
In 2021 the Spanish Gravel Championship and the Spanish Tarmac Championship mixed into the Spanish Rally Superchampionship. The two championships became the Spanish Gravel Cup and the Spanish Tarmac Cup.

The N5 Cup will make a return, after being shut down in 2020.

Calendar 
The Spanish Rally Championship features many different support categories:

 Clio Trophy Spain
 Dacia Sandero Cup
 Suzuki Swift Cup
 Iberian Rally Trophy
 N5 Cup
2RM Trophy

Event Results 
Podium places and informations on each event

References 

Rallying